Atylotus fulvus  is a species of 'horse flies' belonging to the family Tabanidae.

Description
The head of Atylotus is more strongly spherical than in Tabanus and the eyes (in preserved specimens) are usually light brown, often with a faint trace of a thin purple line. The frontal calli of Atylotus are characteristic: the two calli are small, widely separated, and very low in profile. Both of A.fulvus are covered with golden yellow hairs, which are vivid and colourful in life. The abdomen is reddish at sides, basally. No distinct abdominal pattern is visible unless the covering of mingled black and yellow hairs is rubbed away. In this species the calli are small and sometimes absent.

Distribution
Europe, Russia, Morocco, Turkey.

References

Tabanidae
Insects described in 1804
Taxa named by Johann Wilhelm Meigen
Diptera of Europe
Diptera of Africa
Diptera of Asia